The 2017 Fairfield Challenger was a professional tennis tournament played on hard courts. It was the third edition of the tournament which was part of the 2017 ATP Challenger Tour. It took place in Fairfield, California, United States between 9 and 15 October 2017.

Singles main-draw entrants

Seeds

 1 Rankings are as of October 2, 2017.

Other entrants
The following players received wildcards into the singles main draw:
  Axel Geller
  Evan King
  Alexander Sarkissian

The following player received entry into the singles main draw using a protected ranking:
  Frank Dancevic

The following players received entry into the singles main draw as special exempts:
  Kevin King
  Bradley Klahn

The following players received entry from the qualifying draw:
  Sebastian Fanselow
  Christopher O'Connell
  Ruan Roelofse
  Jan Šátral

The following players received entry as lucky losers:
  Sekou Bangoura
  Alejandro González
  Alexander Ward

Champions

Singles

 Mackenzie McDonald def.   Bradley Klahn 6–4, 6–2.

Doubles

  Luke Bambridge /  David O'Hare def.  Akram El Sallaly /  Bernardo Oliveira 6–4, 6–2.

References

2017 ATP Challenger Tour
October 2017 sports events in the United States
Fairfield Challenger